Thomas Christensen may refer to:

 Thomas Guldborg Christensen (born 1984), Danish footballer
 Thomas Christensen (author) (born 1948), American author
 Thomas J. Christensen, American academic and former government official

See also
 Tom Christensen (disambiguation)
 Tommy Christensen (born 1961), Danish footballer
 Thomas Kristensen (born 1983), Danish footballer
 Thomas Christiansen (born 1973), Spanish footballer and manager